Our Lady and St Bede Catholic Academy (formerly Our Lady and St Bede RC School) is a coeducational secondary school located in Stockton-on-Tees, County Durham, England.

Previously a voluntary aided school administered by Stockton-on-Tees Borough Council and the Roman Catholic Diocese of Hexham and Newcastle, Our Lady and St Bede RC School converted to academy status in February 2015 and was renamed Our Lady and St Bede Catholic Academy. The school is still administered by the Diocese of Hexham and Newcastle but is now independent of council control.  Since the school became independent of Stockton Local Authority the progress of pupils has risen significantly.  In 2016 Our Lady and St Bede was the highest performing school in the North East of England using the government's new Progress 8 measure.

Our Lady and St Bede Catholic Academy offers GCSEs and BTECs as programmes of study for pupils. Graduating students often go on to attend Stockton Riverside College or Stockton Sixth Form College.

Subjects Taught

References

External links
Our Lady and St Bede Catholic Academy official website

Secondary schools in the Borough of Stockton-on-Tees
Catholic secondary schools in the Diocese of Hexham and Newcastle
Academies in the Borough of Stockton-on-Tees
Stockton-on-Tees